The following is an incomplete list of association football clubs based in Mauritania.
For a complete list see :Category:Football clubs in Mauritania

A
ASAC Concorde (Nouakchott)
ACAS de Teyarett
ASC Dar El Barka
ASC Dar Naïm (Nouakchott
ASC El Ahmedi FC de Sebkha (Nouakchott)
ASC Imraguens
ASC Kédia	(Zouérate)
ACS Ksar (Nouakchott)
ASC Mauritel Mobile FC (Nouakchott)
ASC Nasr de Sebkha (Nouakchott)
ASC Police
ASC Tevragh-Zeïna

C
CF Cansado (Nouadhibou)

N
Nouadhibou

 
Mauritania
Football
Football clubs